Răzvan Adrian Dâlbea (born 8 October 1981) is a Romanian former footballer who played for teams such as Tricolorul Breaza, Unirea Alba Iulia, Voința Sibiu, Corona Brașov or FC Hermannstadt, among others.

Career
Dâlbea was bought in 2006 by Unirea Alba Iulia from Tricolorul Breaza.

Honours
Unirea Alba Iulia
Liga II: 2008–09

Corona Brașov
Liga II: 2012–13

FC Hermannstadt
Liga III: 2016–17
Cupa României: Runner-up 2017–18

External links
 
 

Living people
1981 births
People from Aiud
Romanian footballers
Association football midfielders
FC Rapid București players
FC Universitatea Cluj players
Liga I players
Liga II players
Liga III players
CSM Unirea Alba Iulia players
AFC Săgeata Năvodari players
CSU Voința Sibiu players
ASA 2013 Târgu Mureș players
CSM Corona Brașov footballers
SCM Râmnicu Vâlcea players
FC Hermannstadt players